Yanling County is a county in Hunan Province, China; it is under the administration of Zhuzhou City. Located on the south eastern margin of the province, the county is bordered to the north by Chaling County, to the west by Anren, Yongxing Counties and Zixing City, to the south by Guidong County, to the east by Suichuan County and Jinggangshan City of Jiangxi. The county has 5 towns and 5 townships under its jurisdiction, the county seat is at Xiayang.

Subdivisions

Yanling County currently has 5 towns and 5 townships.
5 towns
 Luyuan
 Miandu
 Shidu
 Shuikou
 Xiayang

4 townships
 Ceyuan
 Chuanxing
 Longxi
 Xiacun

1 ethnic townships
 Yao Zhongcun

Climate

References

External links
www.xzqh.org 

County-level divisions of Hunan
Zhuzhou
 

Yan Emperor